The 2022 All Japan Women's University Football Championship (第31回全日本大学女子サッカー選手権大会; All Japan 31st University Football Championship) marked the 31st edition of the referred annually contested women's cup for universities across Japan, which started on 24 December 2022 and ended on 6 January 2023. The tournament was contested by 24 universities on a knockout-stage format, organized by the Japan Women's University Football Federation alongside the Japan Football Association. 

The Waseda University were the current champions, lifting their seventh trophy on 2021, after a 1–0 triumph past Shizuoka Sangyo University. This 2022 season, Toyo University managed to win their first trophy, winning by 1–0 past Yamanashi Gakuin University in the final. All the matches were streamed on the All Japan Women's University Football Association Official YouTube Channel.

Calendar
The schedule was decided on 22 November 2022.

Venues
All the matches will be played in two areas, on the Hyogo Prefecture and the Tokyo Metropolis. The two stadiums which will host all the matches from the first round down to the quarter-finals will utilize two grounds, or fields, at the same place, to enable more matches to be simutaneously held. The venues and the city they are located in are as follows:

Miki
Miki Athletic Stadium (No. 1 and No.2) – Host matches from the 1st Round to the quarter-finals
Mikibo Football Ground (No.1 and No.2) – Host matches from the 1st Round to the quarter-finals
Tokyo
Ajinomoto Field Nishigaoka  – Host the Semi-final and the Final

Participating clubs
In parenthesis: Each university's performance at the regional qualifying series.

First round

Round of 16

Quarter-finals

Semi-finals

Final

References

External links
Official Schedule (JFA)
About the Tournament (JFA)

Women's football competitions in Japan
2022 in Japanese women's football
All Japan Women's University Football Championship